Culloden is a small community in the Canadian province of Nova Scotia, located in the Municipality of the District of Digby in Digby County.

Etymology 
Culloden is named for the Battle of Culloden, a battle near Inverness in Scotland in 1746, where many Scots were massacred by the British.

References

Communities in Digby County, Nova Scotia
General Service Areas in Nova Scotia